The 2011 My AOD Favourites Awards, presented by Astro in Malaysia, was an awards ceremony that recognised the best Hong Kong TVB television drama series that had aired on Malaysia's Astro On Demand (AOD) in 2011. 

The ceremony took place on 27 November 2011 at the Suria KLCC in Kuala Lumpur, Malaysia. Astro first broadcast the award show on AOD on 3 December 2011 at 20:30 MST.

Winners and nominees
Top five nominees are in bold.

References

TVB original programming
2011 television awards
2011 in Malaysian television
2011 in Hong Kong television

zh:MY AOD我的最爱颁奖典礼2011